Po Nraup (?–1653), also spelled Po Nraop, was the king of Panduranga Champa who ruled from 1651 to 1653. In Vietnamese records, he was mentioned as Bà Thấm (婆抋).

Po Nraup was a half-brother of Po Rome. His mother was a Churu, his father was a Cham. In 1651, he succeeded as the king of Champa. During his reign, Champa attacked Phú Yên, trying to drive Viet people out of this area. In 1653, Nguyễn Phúc Tần sent 3000 soldiers to attack Champa and captured Po Nraup. Po Nraup was forced to cede all territories north of the Phan Rang River to Vietnam. 

Po Nraup died shortly after this incident, leaving his country in chaos. Vietnamese briefly appointed two vassal kings to rule Champa. Later, Po Saut revolted against Vietnamese.

References

Kings of Champa
Cham people
Churu people
1653 deaths
Year of birth unknown